The 1949 NAIA basketball tournament was held in March at Municipal Auditorium in Kansas City, Missouri. The 12th annual NAIA basketball tournament featured 32 teams playing in a single-elimination format.

The championship game featured Hamline defeating Regis, 57–46.

Hamline's championship win would make them the first team to win two non-consecutive tournaments (1942, and 1949). Regis, in their first tournament appearance, would finish as the National Runner-Up, but it would be the highest finish Regis would ever see of the 5 tournament appearances. Regis would make it back to the NAIA Semifinals in 1951, only to finish in fourth place.

Awards and honors
Many of the records set by the 1949 tournament have been broken, and many of the awards were established much later:
Leading scorer est. 1963
Leading rebounder est. 1963
Charles Stevenson Hustle Award est. 1958
Coach of the Year est. 1954
Player of the Year est. 1994
All-time scoring leader; third appearance: Harold Haskins, 12th, Hamline (Minn.) (1947,48,49,50), 14 games, 104 field goals, 72 free throws, 280 total points, 20.0 average per game.

Bracket

  * denotes each overtime.

See also
 1949 NCAA basketball tournament
 1949 National Invitation Tournament

References

NAIA Men's Basketball Championship
Tournament
1949 in Missouri